Chilamur is a village in Belgaum district in the Northern state of Karnataka, India.

References

Villages in Belagavi district